Ahsanullah Montu (7 February 1962 – 26 June 2018) was a Bangladeshi football player who played as a center-back. He represented the Bangladesh national football team in the mid 80s, and spent most of his club career playing for Mohammedan SC.

Career
In 1981, Montu began his career with Farashganj SC in the Dhaka League. He got a place in the  Bangladesh U20 team while playing for Brothers Union, in 1984. The following year, he made his senior team debut during President's Gold Cup, while playing for office team Sadharan Bima CSC. In 1986, Montu joined Mohammedan SC and thus, became a mainstay in the national team. Under Iranian coach Nasser Hejazi, Montu established himself as one of the best defenders in the country with the Black and Whites. He won the league title in 1986, 1987, 1988–89 and 1993. In 1988, he played for Mohammedan in India's Sait Nagjee Trophy. While in the national team, Montu went onto represent the Bangladesh Red (main national team) in 1987 and 1989 editions of the President's Gold Cup. He also played the qualifiers of the 1990 FIFA World Cup and 1988 AFC Asian Cup qualifiers, retiring from football in 1993.

Honours

Mohammedan SC
 Dhaka League = 1986, 1987, 1988–89, 1993
 Federation Cup = 1987, 1989

Death
On 26 June 2018, Montu passed away after suffering from a cardiac arrest.

References

1962 births
2018 deaths
Bangladeshi footballers
Bangladesh international footballers
People from Brahmanbaria district
Association football defenders
Mohammedan SC (Dhaka) players
Brothers Union players
Farashganj SC players
Bangladeshi football coaches